Cumbres del Guadalfeo (previously called Contraviesa-Alpujarra ) is a Spanish geographical indication for Vino de la Tierra wines located in the Alpujarras mountains, in the autonomous region of Andalusia. Vino de la Tierra is one step below the mainstream Denominación de Origen indication on the Spanish wine quality ladder.

The area covered by this geographical indication comprises the following municipalities: Albondón, Albuñol, Almegíjar, Cádiar, Cástaras, Lobras, Murtas, Polopos, Rubite, Sorvilán, Torvizcón, Turón, and Ugíjar, in the province of Granada (Andalusia, Spain).

It acquired its Vino de la Tierra status in 2004.

Grape varieties
 Red: Garnacha tinta, Cabernet Franc, Pinot noir, Syrah, Cabernet Sauvignon, Tempranillo and Merlot
 White: Jaén blanco, Montúa, Perruno, Vijiriego, Pedro Ximénez, Chardonnay and Moscatel

References

Spanish wine
Wine regions of Spain
Wine-related lists
Appellations